Sahak Bagratuni might refer to: 

 Sahak II Bagratuni
 Sahak VII Bagratuni, Prince of Armenia (754-771)